La Roque-sur-Cèze (Occitan: La Ròca de Céser) is a commune in the Gard department in the Occitanie region of Southern France. In 2016, it had a population of 187.

Population

See also
Communes of the Gard department

References

Communes of Gard
Plus Beaux Villages de France